The Riversleigh rainforest koala (Nimiokoala greystanesi) is an extinct marsupial, closely related to the extant koala, that inhabited northwestern Queensland in the early-middle Miocene (23–16 million years ago). Along with species of sister genus Litokoala, the Riversleigh rainforest koala is the smallest representative of family Phascolarctide. Based on cladistic analysis, Nimiokoala is one of the more basal genera of Phascolarctide. It died out due to climate change rendering the environment more arid. It probably had a more generalized diet than that of the modern species, but its exact food preferences are unknown.

Etymology 
The generic name, Nimiokoala, is derived from the Latin word Nimio "excessive" referring to its complex molar morphology relative to other koala species. The specific name, greystanesi, honors Greystanes High School.

History of research 
As of 2013, the fossil record of extinct koalas consists of 163 specimens across 58 deposits in Riversleigh; 55 specimens are attributed to the Riversleigh rainforest koala. To date, a partial skull has been found along with several lower jaws and isolated teeth.  On the basis of these fossils, the dental apparatus of the animal has been completely restored. The species was named in 1997. Specimen QMF30482 was assigned as a holotype; its bones are stored in the Queensland Museum.

Description 
In the absence of postcranial fossils, the dimensions of the Riversleigh rainforest koala were calculated from measurements of its surviving teeth. It is estimated to have body length of about 25–30 cm (9.8-11.8 in), and a weight of about 3.5 kg (7.7 lb), one third the size of modern koalas and more than 10 times smaller than the largest known representative of Phascolarctide (Phascolarctos yorkensis). Its muzzle was more prominent than that of modern koalas, resembling the possum snout.  The teeth of the Riversleigh rainforest koala are selenodontal (crescent-shaped), with a numerous cusps and accessory shearing blades.  The fossilized skull contains large orbits and very large auditory bulliae relative to its size.

Ecology and behavior 
In the early-middle Miocene, Riversleigh was covered with tropical forests. More open areas, with karst soil, occurred at forest edges or freshwater streams and lakes. As the climate became more arid, with a more pronounced change of seasons, small species of koalas died out, including the Riversleigh rainforest koala.

The small size of Nimiokoala, which requires a proportionately more intensive diet, and large eye sockets, which indicate good night vision, suggest that this animal was much more mobile than the modern koala.  The structure of the ear of Nimikoala corresponds to that which can be observed in modern koalas; in conjunction with the large auditory bulliae, it can be concluded that the Riversleigh rainforest koala was sensitive to and used low-frequency sounds for communication, including to attract mates.

References

Pleistocene mammals of Australia
Prehistoric vombatiforms
Pleistocene marsupials
Koalas
Riversleigh fauna
Fossil taxa described in 1997